Cyclamen coum, the eastern sowbread, is a species of flowering plant in the family Primulaceae. It is valued in horticulture as groundcover, and for the flowers which bloom in winter and early spring.

Description
The tuber produces roots from the center of the bottom only.

The leaves are round or kidney-shaped to long heart-shaped. The color is all-silver, all-green, or silver variegated with a variably sized green hastate (arrowhead-shaped) or "Christmas tree" pattern and a green edge. The edge is smooth or gently toothed, but never angled and pointed as in Cyclamen hederifolium.

The flowers are squat, with almost round petals, unlike any other group of cyclamen species. They bloom from winter to spring. The petals are magenta, pink, or white, with a darker blotch at the base. Below the blotch is a small white or pink "eye".

Etymology
The species name coum more likely refers to Koa or Quwê (an ancient region in eastern Cilicia, southeastern Turkey), which is part of the species' natural range, than to the island of Kos, where the species does not grow.

Distribution
Cyclamen coum is native to two areas. The main range is around the Black Sea, from Bulgaria through northern Turkey to the Caucasus and Crimea, and a disjunct population lies near the Mediterranean from the Hatay Province in Turkey through Lebanon to northern Israel.

Cyclamen coum subsp. coum inhabits the western part of the main range and the southern area, while C. coum subsp. caucasicum inhabits the eastern part, including the Caucasus. Plants with intermediate characteristics are found in the middle of the range.

Cultivation
Cyclamen coum self-seeds and grows more slowly than Cyclamen hederifolium and is usually out-competed when the two are grown together. The species C. coum and the form C. coum subsp. coum f. coum Pewter Group have gained the Royal Horticultural Society's Award of Garden Merit (confirmed 2017).

Hardiness

Subspecies and forms
There are two subspecies and three forms, distinguished by leaf and flower characteristics. Cyclamen elegans was formerly considered a subspecies (Cyclamen coum subsp. elegans), but is now a species in its own right.
 leaf as wide or broader than long
 Cyclamen coum subsp. coum (west and south) — leaf edge usually smooth, petal lobes 
Cyclamen coum subsp. coum f. coum — petals pink to magenta, with dark markings at base of petal lobe
Cyclamen coum subsp. coum f. pallidum — petals white or very pale pink, with dark markings
Cyclamen coum subsp. coum f. albissimum — petals pure white, without markings
 leaf longer than wide
 Cyclamen coum subsp. caucasicum (east) — leaf wavy-edged — petals 

Note: The isolate population of Crimea, formerly called Cyclamen kuznetzovii Kotov & Czernova, is now considered as a local variant of Cyclamen coum.

Gallery

Similar species
The Cyclamen coum group also includes Cyclamen abchasicum, Cyclamen elegans, Cyclamen alpinum, Cyclamen parviflorum and Cyclamen pseudibericum.

leaves wider than long
Cyclamen parviflorum
flowers tiny; leaves green
leaves longer than wide; leaf edge coarsely toothed, scalloped, or shallowly lobed
petals as long as Cyclamen coum
Cyclamen alpinum (formerly Cyclamen trochopteranthum)
petals horizontal, twisted like a propeller; leaves speckled with grey
petals longer than Cyclamen coum
 Cyclamen abchasicum (formerly Cyclamen coum var. abchasicum)
taxon between Cyclamen coum and Cyclamen elegans
Cyclamen elegans (formerly Cyclamen coum subsp. elegans)
Cyclamen pseudibericum
petals with broad dark blotch and white band on nose

Hybrid
Cyclamen ×drydenii Grey-Wilson, a hybrid Cyclamen coum × Cyclamen alpinum, has intermediate characteristics, i.e., round leaves and horizontal twisted petals.

References

External links

Cyclamen Society
Pacific Bulb Society
Botany Photo of the Day — University of British Columbia Botanical Garden

coum
Flora of Western Asia
Flora of Lebanon
Taxa named by Philip Miller
Flora of Bulgaria